Pakubuwono II (also transliterated Pakubuwana II) (1711–1749) was the last ruler of Mataram and the first Susuhunan (ruler of Surakarta).

His correct title in Javanese etiquette standards contains honorific appellations, some of which each successive ruler inherits. His move of his court from Kartasura to Surakarta was to avert the calamities occurred at the former palace.

References

Burials at Imogiri
Susuhunan of Surakarta
1711 births
1749 deaths
Mataram Sultanate
18th-century Indonesian people
Indonesian royalty